The Feuerstein is a twin peak in the Stubai Alps on the border of Tyrol and South Tyrol.

References 

Walter Klier: Stubaier Alpen, Alpine Club Guide, Munich, 2006, 
Eduard Richter, Die Erschließung der Ostalpen, Berlin, Verlag des Deutschen und Oesterreichischen Alpenvereins, 1893/1894
Alpine Club map, 1:25,000 series, Sheet 31/1 Stubaier Alpen, Hochstubai

External links 

Mountains of the Alps
Mountains of Tyrol (state)
Mountains of South Tyrol
Alpine three-thousanders
Stubai Alps
Austria–Italy border
International mountains of Europe